Cebuano grammar encompasses the rules that define the Cebuano language, the most widely spoken of all the languages in the Visayan Group of languages, spoken in Cebu, Bohol, Siquijor, part of Leyte island, part of Samar island, Negros Oriental, especially in Dumaguete, and the majority of cities and provinces of Mindanao. 

Cebuano has eight basic parts of speech: nouns, pronouns, verbs, adjectives, adverbs, particles, prepositions and conjunctions. Cebuano is an agglutinative yet partially inflected language: pronouns are inflected by number, and verbs are inflected for aspect, focus, and mood.

Morphosyntactic alignment 
Cebuano, along with many other Philippine languages, are sometimes considered ergative or nominative in alignment, both being incorrect and correct as it has features of both systems.

Cebuano verbs are morphologically complex and take on a variety of affixes reflecting voice, quality, aspect, mood, and others. Cebuano arguably follows Austronesian alignment. Basically, verbs conjugate by using these affixes according to which argumentative role the noun in the direct case has. This noun in the direct case can be the doer of the action, the recipient of the action, the purpose for the action, or the means by which the action was made possible; which are all argumentative roles. The direct case hides the noun's otherwise-evident argumentative role, which the verb then makes up for by conjugating with specific affixes that indicate which argumentative role the noun in the direct case has. Some Cebuano grammar teachers call the noun in the direct case the topic of the sentence, but some others call it the focus, voice, or trigger; as the verb and the other nouns in the sentence have all their noun markers and affixes change accordingly. 

Cebuano has four voices:
 the active voice a.k.a. the agent trigger
 the passive voice for direct objects a.k.a. the patient trigger
 the passive voice for indirect objects and/or locations a.k.a. the circumstantial trigger
 the passive voice for instruments a.k.a. the instrument trigger.

The direct case morpheme, which marks the topic in Cebuano, is ang or si.

Agent trigger

Here, the agent/doer Maria is marked with si, the personal direct noun marker. The prefix Mo- indicates that the noun in the direct case (Maria) is also the agent/doer, which would not have been known otherwise.

Patient trigger

Here, the patient/object Bugas is marked with ang, the general direct noun marker. The suffix -on indicates that the noun in the direct case (bugas) is also the patient/object, which would not have been known otherwise. Babaye is marked with sa, the general indirect noun marker which indicates that babaye is not in the direct case but is still the agent/doer of the sentence. Via context and common word order, it is evident that lata is not the agent despite it being marked with sa as well (in this case, it is used as the general oblique definite noun marker). It is not the first noun in the sentence (as the agent/doer usually is) and nor can a can cook rice on its own (context).

Circumstantial trigger
The circumstantial trigger affixes select for location, benefactee and/or goal topics.

With location subject

Here, the location/indirect object lata is marked with ang, the general direct noun marker. The suffix -an indicates that the noun in the direct case (lata) is also the location of the action, which would not have been known otherwise. Babaye is marked with sa, the general indirect noun marker which indicates that babaye is not in the direct case but is still the agent of the sentence. Bugas is marked with the general oblique indefinite marker og, indicating that it is neither the noun in the direct case nor the agent noun, but rather that it is the direct object of the sentence.

With benefactee subject

Here, the indirect object or benefactee Pedro is marked with si, the personal direct noun marker. The suffix -an indicates that the noun in the direct case (Pedro) is also the indirect object of the action, which would not have been known otherwise. Maria is marked with the personal indirect noun marker ni, which indicates that Maria is not the noun in the direct case but is still the agent of the sentence. Kalamay is marked with the general oblique indefinite marker og, indicating that kalamay is neither the noun in the direct case nor the agent/doer, but rather, it is the direct object.

With goal subject

Here, it is similar to the circumstantial trigger (with benefactee subject) in that the goal subject Perla is also the indirect object of the sentence. Perla is marked by si, the personal direct noun marker, and is known to be the indirect object of the sentence due to the verb suffix -an, which indicates that the noun in the direct case would be the indirect object of the sentence.

Instrument trigger

Here, the instrument lapis is marked with ang, the general direct noun marker. The prefix I- indicates that the noun in the direct case (lapis) is also the instrument used to complete the action, which would not have been known otherwise. Linda is marked with the personal indirect noun marker ni, which indicates that Linda is not the noun in the direct case, yet is still the agent of the sentence. Sulat is marked with the general oblique indefinite marker og, indicating that sulat is neither the noun in the direct case nor the agent/doer, but rather, it is the direct object.

Pronouns

Personal pronouns
Pronouns are inflected for person, number and case. No gender distinctions are made for the third person singular: he, she, and they (singular) are all translated in Cebuano as siya.

The three cases are direct, indirect, and oblique. The noun markers and pronouns follow their own particular set of rules for syntax and grammar.

The indirect case also functions as a genitive.

 Postposed meaning it comes after the noun: iro nako (my dog).
 Preposed meaning it comes before the noun: akong iro (my dog).

Usage of full and short forms
The short forms are used most often in conversation. However, the full forms must be used when they occur on their own as a predicate.

Examples (Those marked with an asterisk, "*", are ungrammatical):

But...
 Ako si Juan.
 Ako mao'y moadto ngadto sa Banawa.

First person plural: clusivity
In Cebuano, like most other Austronesian languages, the first person plural forms encode clusivity. This distinction, not found in most European languages, signifies whether or not the addressee is included.

Demonstratives
Cebuano demonstratives are as follows:

Adverbs

Deictics
Deictics, words such as here and there, reference locations between the speaker and addressee. In addition to the same four-way distinction of proximity for demonstratives (near speaker, near speaker and addressee, near addressee and remote), deictics can express three tenses:

 Present: "X is here/there now"
 Past: "X was here/there"
 Future: "X will be here/there"

The present and future tense forms can precede or follow the words or phrases they modify by linking with nga. The past tense forms, however, only have a past meaning if they precede their words or phrases. If they follow, they convey no tense.

The allative forms are always tenseless. They follow the words or phrases they modify and can substitute equivalent past forms. In addition, they show movement or motion to the relative location which past forms cannot.

Nouns
Cebuano nouns fall into of two classes: personal and general. Personal nouns refer to persons or personified objects and animals and names. All other nouns fall into the general category. Nouns do not inflect for case or number: Case is shown using case markers; the plural number is show with the particle mga.

Case
Cebuano nouns assume three cases based on their role in a sentence:
 Direct – This is the case of focus or topic. This case is used in both actor-focus and non-actor focus verb forms. This case follows the Austronesian alignment. The verb partly conjugates according to the argumentative role inherit within the noun that is marked by this case.
 Indirect – This is the case of the actor/agent/doer in non-actor focus verb forms. This is also the case of possession/ownership and works similar to the genitive case.
Oblique – A peripheral case; this is the case of the indirect object, the direct object, and/or the instrument in both actor-focus verb sentences and non-actor focus verb sentences, when the noun it modifies is also not the focus/topic. It is used to mention anything beyond the topic or focus other than the indirect case that might still be important for context and communication. Simply put, it is to mark any noun that is neither the actor/agent/doer nor the topic/focus of the sentence.

† These words are already considered archaic but survive as the affix -y, as in "sila'y niadto" or "unsa'y ato".

The use of sa vs. og in the indirect and oblique case is a matter of definiteness when the noun is the object of an actor-focus verb. Compare the following examples.

[Definite] Mipalit si Juan sa sakyanan. John bought the car.
[Indefinite] Mipalit si Juan og sakyanan. John bought a car.

In example sentence 1, the car that John bought is particular. It may have been a car he was thinking about buying or one that the speaker was selling John. In 2, the speaker may or may not know the specifics about the car in question.

Sa and og can both be used for the roles of the genitive case, but only sa can be used for the actor or agent case. Og is used for adverbs as well.

Number
Plurality is shown by preceding the noun with the particle mga /maŋa/.

There are special cases though:

1. Adding the prefix ka- before and the suffix -an can pluralize a noun (the suffix -han is used if the root word ends with a vowel). This word treatment is used to group what are considered identical objects as one entity. Examples are:
libot, which is regularly used as a verb meaning to go around but in this case is used as a noun meaning "surrounding" (as in palibot), can be changed to kalibotan, which means "world" (or 'the entire surroundings').
tawo, which means "man" or "person", can be changed to katawhan, which means "men" or "people". The vowel "o" is omitted in this case because the "w" carries the sound of "o" by itself.
balay (house): kabalayan (houses)
bata (child/boy/girl): kabata-an. The suffix used here is -an instead of -han since bata /bataʔ/ ends in a glottal stop. 
"nasud" (nation): "kanasuran" (nations). The "d" changed to "r" because that usually (not always) happens to "d" when placed between two vowels, though in Cebuano, d and r are not allophones, unlike in other Philippine languages.

Although it is tolerable in some cases, the use of mga before a noun applied with ka- -an is not necessary anymore. ang mga kabata-an (the children) is considered redundant, and ang kabata-an is more grammatically accurate.

Because the use of ka- -an groups objects into one entity, there are cases that a word will mean a place of which the objects are frequently or usually found/exist. An example is:
kasagingan (from the root word saging (banana)) does not mean "bananas". Instead, it means 'a place of bananas' or simply "banana farm".

2. There is this very rare case in which an adjective can be pluralized, and the noun it describes can be, but is not necessarily, omitted.
Example: the word gamay (small) can be changed to gagmay (small ones), in which "g" was inserted in between the first and second syllable. The same rule can be applied to dako, which means 'big', changing it to dagko (big ones). Other examples are:
ta-as (long): tag-as (long ones)
mubo (short): mugbo (short ones)
layo (far): lagyo (far ones)
du-ol (near): dug-ol (near ones)
nipis (thin): nigpis (thin ones)
lapad (wide): lagpad (wide ones)

This rule cannot be applied to all other adjectives.

Gender
As a rule, Cebuano does not categorize nouns by gender. Natural gender is found in Spanish loanwords and some native words, including words with Spanish-derived gendered affixes.

Adjectives

Plural forms
Adjectives do not inflect for the plural. Common adjectives of measurement, however, have a plural form characterized by the infixation of /g/.

Comparative
In comparing two similar items, the comparative form indicates that one has a higher degree (or lower degree) of the quality expressed by the root, e.g., bigger, smaller, greater, etc.

The comparative degree is expressed in the following ways:
 Precede the adjective with labi pa ("more [still]")
 Precede the adjective with the particle mas (from Spanish más)

Comparative superlative
The comparative superlative indicates the maximum degree of the quality expressed in comparison to other items. In Cebuano this degree can be expressed by a circumfix, kina- -an or by the use of the particle labi (most). The prefix pinaka- is also used.

Absolute superlative
The absolute superlative is the form used in exclamations, for example, "How pretty you are!", and denote the extreme quality of the root.

It is formed by prefixing pagka- or ka- (short form) to the root. The subject follows in the oblique.

Examples:
 Pagkanindot kanimo! (Full)
 Kanindot nimo! (Short)
 How pretty you are! You are extremely pretty!

Intensive
To express intensity, adjectives are followed by kaayo (very).

Examples:
 Ang mga duwende mugbo kaayo.
 Dwarves are very short.

Linkers

Nga
The linker nga (pronounced /ŋa/) shows the relationship between modifiers to the head of the phrase. Examples of such relationships are adjective–noun, clause–noun, adverb–verb, adverb–adjective and noun–noun. Without the intervening linker, juxtaposition of modifier and head can constitute, not a phrase, but a sentence unto itself. 
Compare the phrase ang batang lalaki ("the/a young man/boy") and the sentence ang bata lalaki ("the child is male" or "the child is a boy").

After words that end in a monophthong, diphthong or -n, nga is optionally reduced to the suffix -ng /-ŋ/.

Unlike Tagalog, which uses the linker na for all modifiers, including numbers, the Cebuano linker nga is not used with numbers; ka, as shown below, is used instead.

Ka
The linker ka is used to link a number and the phrase it modifies. Buok (whole) is sometimes used with ka.

Enclitic particles

Cebuano uses a lot of particles that could change the intended meaning or expression of a sentence. Here is a list of particles used in day-to-day conversation:

 na: references a past situation to the present
 (in positive statements): now, already
 aduna na/naa na — it now exists 
 (nuance: it didn't exist before)
 (in negative statements): anymore
 walâ na — it doesn't exist anymore
 (nuance: it existed before)
 pa: references a future situation to the present
 (in positive statements): still
 aduna pa/naa pa — it still exists
 (nuance: it will not exist sometime after)
 (in negative statements): yet
 walâ pa — it doesn't exist yet
 (nuance: it will exist sometime after)
 ba: used for yes-and-no questions and optionally for other types of questions.
 ra/da and lang/lamanɡ: limiting particle; just, only.
 gyud/gayúd, bitáw, lagí, gánì: indeed; used in affirmations or emphasis.
 usáb, upód: also, too
 man, ugód: expresses (new) information, or contradicts a previous statement
 uróy: corrects a (supposed) misconception
 person 1: walâ pa ka mahumán? — aren't you done yet?
 person 2: humán na uróy! — I am!
 bayâ: expresses admonition; watch out
 mamaak bayâ na'ng iroa — watch out! that dog bites
 diáy: indicates that the speaker has received new information
 dà: 
 (initial in a clause): there, I told you so!
  dà, nasamad hinuon — I told you! now you've hurt yourself
 (ending a clause): expresses sudden, unexpected, or unwanted emotion; as when remembering something forgotten
 gitugnaw ko dà! — I feel cold! (nuance: I didn't expect to become cold)
 kunó, daw: indicates second-hand information; he said, it is said, reportedly, allegedly, etc.
 guro/siguro, tingálì: expresses uncertainty; probably, maybe
 kahâ/kayhâ: expresses wonder; I wonder, perhaps
 úntà/máytà (short for "maayo úntà"): expresses hope; I hope
 kay: indicates cause; because. 
 also used as a linking word in sentences with Subject-Predicate structure (compare "is/was/be" in English)
 si Maria kay nabuntis — Maria was pregnant
 maó: (it/he/she) is/was/will be the one...
 si Maria maó'y nabuntis — it was Maria who got pregnant
 gánì: even
 bisan: even though, even if, although
 hinuon (shortened to "nuon"): instead, however, rather; as a result
 úsà: for now, for the time being
 intawon: expresses pity
 puhón: God willing, in the future

The following are particles that are usually only found at the end of a sentence:
 ha: asks listener if they understand, or if they agree
 dilì ni sabunán, ha? — don’t wash this with soap, do you understand?
 no, sa (from "unsá" meaning "what?"): asks to clarify; isn't that right?
 dilì ka moinom, no? — you don't drink liquor, do you?
 ay: follows a word to call someone's attention to it
 tua sa iskina ay! — it’s right there at the corner!
 uy/oy:
 expresses annoyance
 expresses surprise upon discovering something

These particles can be paired with one or more particles to form a more specific meaning. One exception is with na and pa, which cannot be used in the same sentence.
 maó + ra + og = murag: like, seemingly
 maó + gyud/bitáw/lagí/gánì: that is so; strongly affirming a statement
 maó + ra + pud + nuon: that’s the only thing that’s wrong with it
 ba + gud: expresses disbelief; how is it possible that (so-and-so) should happen?
 na + lang: now it is only (so-and-so much) when it was more before; (so-and-so) will do it, though it should not be so
 pa + lang: (such-and-such) was the first; lest (so-and-so) happen; if (so-and-so) had been the case
 etc.InterrogativesUnsa?                        What?Asa?                         Where? (esp. for a place or person)Diin?, Dis-a?           Where? (esp. for past occurrence)Hain?, Saa/Asa?        Where? (esp. for an object)Kinsa?                       Who?Kang kinsa?                  To whom?Ngano?                       Why?Giunsa?                     How? (past)Unsaon?                     How? (future)Kanus-a?                     When?Pila (ka buok)?     How many?Tagpila?                     How much?Ikapila?                     What order?Di-ay ba?                    Really?

The words asa, diin, and hain can be used interchangeably in everyday speech. Although their use is distinguished in formal contexts:Asa is used when asking about a place.Asa ka padulong? (Where are you going?)Asa ta molarga? (Where are we traveling to?)Hain is used when asking about the location of a thing.Hain ang gunting? (Where is the pair of scissors?)Hain na ang pagka-on sa pista? (Where is the food for the festival)

It is worth noting that in spoken Cebuano, asa has slowly become the main word for where. In fact, hain, except by older generations, is rarely used.

Verbs
Verbs in Cebuano conjugate according to several factors: to divulge/agree with the argumentative role that the noun marked by the direct case has; the voice; the form; the mood; and the aspect/tense of the sentence.

 Verb roots vs. verb stems 
A verb root is the simplest version of a verb that conveys its overall meaning or lemma and cannot be broken down any further (excluding morphological processes and colloquial speech).

The affixes that are used to altogether describe the argumentative role, the voice, the form, the mood, and the aspect/tense cannot be added to the verb root, only to the verb stem. 

The verb stem may be created through the addition of certain affixes that are not related to the affixes used to altogether describe the argumentative role, the voice, the form, the mood, and the aspect/tense of the sentence. Sometimes, the verb stem is identical to the verb root.A commonly known verb stem affix is the prefix pa-, added to the beginning of a verb root (and sometimes, other verb stems) in order to convey the meaning of to cause. For example, padala is a verb stem that has the meaning of to send, while dala is its own verb root and verb stem, meaning to bring. Concluding that padala could literally mean to cause to bring. Another commonly known affix is the prefix hi- which is added to verb roots/stems in the stative form so that the verb may take in a direct object, as verbs in the stative form are not able to take a direct object without it.

 The moods, forms, and aspects/tenses 
Verbs in Cebuano not only conjugate according to the argumentative role of the noun that is marked by the direct case, but also according to the voice, the form, the mood, and the aspect/tense of the sentence. Cebuano verbs conjugate accordingly through the use of affixes on the verb stem.

 Mood 
There are three moods that the verbal affixes may pertain to in the Cebuano language. The three moods are:

 The indicative mood 
This is the default mood of verbs in which the action is most commonly described. This mood does have imperative aspects in only some certain forms.

 The mirative mood 
This is the mood where the action is unexpected or unintended. There is no imperative aspect for this mood. This mood is used differently in Cebuano than its usual use, see mirative mood. Some may describe this mood as dubitative or subjunctive.

 The potential mood 
This is the mood where the action is able to happen or allowed to happen. This mood may also be used to convey a statement or general possibility. There is no imperative aspect for this mood.

The prefixes naka- and maka- (mostly used for this mood) may be shortened to ka- in colloquial speech and in colloquial writing, which gets rid of the aspect/tense found within these prefixes. Similarly, the prefixes naga- and maga- are colloquially shortened to ga-, however, ga- is usually considered as past and/or strictly present tense.

Form
There are four forms that the verbal affixes may pertain to in the Cebuano language. The four forms are:

 The intentional form 
This is the form where the action was, is, or will be instantly completed. Usually, the affixes of this form hint at a sort of intention or will to do the action/verb. This form is also the form where the action may just be a statement.

 The durative form 
This is the form where the action takes place over a duration of time. See durative aspect.

 The stative form 
This is the form where the action expresses the state of being, condition, and/or emotion of a subject/object. This mood also may express a change going on within someone/something. Usually, verbs that express this mood cannot take in direct objects unless the prefix hi- is added to the original verb stem, creating a new verb stem that allows direct objects to be taken in.

 The reciprocal form 
This is the form where the action is being reciprocated between two persons/things to each other.

 Tense vs. aspect 
Cebuano generally does not use tense, rather it uses aspect. Cebuano verbs conjugate according to a voice, a mood, a form, and an aspect. According to the functionalist school of grammar, there are two aspects: the nasugdan (incepted [past/present inchoative]) aspect and the pagasugdan (incepting [future/habitual inchoative]) aspect. They claim that Cebuano verbs feature the aspects of inception; that is whether the action has been initiated or not. 

The nasugdan aspect is the aspect where the action had already started in the past, while the pagasugdan aspect is the aspect where the action has not started yet. Basically, past and present actions are in the nasugdan aspect while future actions and habitual actions are in the pagasugdan aspect. Although habitual actions started in the past, they have yet to start again. Hence, they are in the pagasugdan aspect.

The imperatibo (imperative/command) mood is commonly grouped together with these aspects (and not with the other moods) because there are multiple imperatives of the same verb that exist according to which form is in use.

In Cebuano, verbs may also conjugate for or to agree with negatibo (negative) sentences. However, the verb itself is not negative, it just agrees with the negative words wala and dili through the negatibo verbal affixes. Wala is used for the nasugdan aspect and dili is used for the pagasugdan aspect. Ayaw is used as the negative imperative, see prohibitive mood.

 The verbal affixes 
The verbal affixes that feature altogether the voice, mood, form, and aspect may overlap. Some of these affixes are shortened in speech and in informal writing.

Not all groups of affixes can be used for some verbs; some verbs may not make sense with certain groups of affixes. For example, the verb stem anhi (to come) cannot have any of the passive voices' affixes; it would not make sense with such affixes. 

The only way to know which groups of affixes are able to be used for each verb stem are through memorization/experience. In addition to that, in certain verbs, the affixes take on different meanings and may overlap or replace other affixes in different forms due to historical use. For example, the verb stem buak (to break) uses the same affixes that is used in the potential mood as the affixes used for the transitory form in the indicative mood. Using the normal affixes of the transitory form in the active voice for buak would sound incorrect to native speakers. Despite all that, the way the affixes are labeled are the way they are mostly used regardless. 

Some affixes may be missing from the examples. 

 Active voice affixes 
The active voice in Cebuano (a.k.a. the agent trigger) is the voice where the topic of the sentence is the agent (a.k.a. the doer, the subject, the actor) of the sentence. The verb partly conjugates according to the fact that the agent is the topic. All active voice affixes are actually prefixes.

These affixes not only have the essence that they are instantaneous, but they also have the essence of intention; that the topic willed for it to happen. It also has the essence of motion or movement. The prefix mi- is more formal than ni-; otherwise, they are interchangeable. It is common to use pag- because it is a common imperative affix in the active voice in Cebuano.

With verb stems like adto, mo- may sometimes be used as the nasugdan aspect because although it started in the past and may still be going on, the destination may not have been reached yet. Adto also means to go, and when used in the present tense, it is understandable that it may use mo- for a nasugdan aspect.

The prefixes naga- and maga- may be shortened to ga- in colloquial speech and in colloquial writing, which may indicate a lack of aspect but it still preserves the form. Some argue that the difference between nag- and mag- versus naga- and maga- are either in formality (naga- and maga- being more formal) or in tense (naga- being more in the present and nag- being more in the past, while maga- and mag- are interchangeable).

The prefixes naka- and maka- may be shortened to ka- in colloquial speech and in colloquial writing, which may get rid of the aspect within the prefixes. This could be similar to naga- and maga- being shortened to ga-.

Plurality depends on whether the topic is a plural noun. The topic may be the subject, the object, etc., however, because this is the active voice, the topic should always be the Subject with these plural affixes. As long as the subjects are plural, the plural version is usually used, but this is not always mandatory. Some verbs only use the plural version while other verbs are rarely used in their plural versions. 

* The "ng" in nang- and mang- may change to "m" or "n" or delete the next consonant depending on the succeeding consonant. Refer to the Morphological Process of Assimilation in Cebuano for more information. 

Sometimes pang- is used as the plural version of the imperatibo mood.

the stative form does not have a potential mood. The hi- prefix before gugma is necessary for the verb to take in a direct object, so the "imperatibo examples" would imply a direct object. The nagka- and magka- prefixes are different from the na- and ma- in that they have the essence of a slowly but surely, or steady, change that is occurring within the topic. They are not used as often anymore, so the same essence may be achieved with the na- and ma- prefixes nowadays. However, pagka- just has more emphasis than ka- may have, and pagka- is still commonly used today. The mirative mood with the nagka- and magka- prefixes is no longer known nor used. The plural prefixes nang- and mang- become nanga- and manga- if the verb also includes these prefixes: na-, ma-, and ka-. For example, "Nangahigugma kami kanimo," which means "We love you."  
 

The reciprocal form does not have a potential mood. This form is not in common use anymore.

 Passive voice for direct objects affixes 
The passive voice for direct objects in Cebuano (a.k.a. the patient trigger) is the voice where the topic of the sentence is the direct object (a.k.a. the patient, the goal, etc.) of the sentence. Hence, the verb partly conjugates accordingly.

* Imnon and Imna went through some of the morphological processes in Cebuano. The mirative and potential moods are the same for these forms of affixes. In the "negatibo aspect," the indirect personal pronouns are usually put before the verb. A noun in the indirect case, or a proper noun in the indirect case, would both be put after the verb. For example, "Dili imnon sa iring ang gatas." which means "The milk will not be drunk by the cat."
 Passive voice for indirect objects affixes 
The passive voice for indirect objects in Cebuano (a.k.a. the circumstantial triggers) is the voice where the topic of the sentence is the indirect object (a.k.a. the benefactee, the location, the goal, etc.) of the sentence. Hence, the verb partly conjugates accordingly.

In the examples, the topic is the dog (the indirect object) and it is used as the topic to emphasize that the dog got the gift, nothing else. In context, a person may say this to you when you are confused about whom/what you should get the gift for. Perhaps there is a cat and a dog and the person clarifies that you got/get/will get/should get a gift for the dog (and not the cat).

 Passive voice for instruments affixes 
The passive voice for instruments (a.k.a. the instrumental trigger) is the voice where the topic of the sentence is the instrument of the sentence. The instrument is the noun that is used for the action of the sentence.

The prefix gi- may also be used/confused with the intentional and durative forms's affixes in the passive voice of direct objects''.

There are over 2000 different verbs in Cebuano to choose from and to use. There are many more affixes that can be used for verb roots, verb stems, and new words.

Negation 
Words for negation in Cebuano acts as a verb.

Syntax

Sentences
1) Equational (topic = predicate) – In this sentence type, one can interchange the topic and the predicate without changing the thought of the sentence.
   
  a) ""              = This is the Visayas.
  b) ""                  = We speak Cebuano here.
  c) ""        = Do you know how to speak Cebuano?

2) Non-equational (topic < predicate) – In this sentence type, the topic and the predicate are not interchangeable.
   
  a) ""              = Visayans are Filipinos.
  b) ""           = What do you need?
  c) ""               = How are the politics?

3) Existential sentence of presence – Sentences of this type tells the existence of a thing or idea.
   
  a) ""               = There is a God in heaven.
  b) ""                = There was a snake in the tree.

4) Existential sentence of possession – Sentences of this type tell about someone or something possessing something.
 
  a) "" = The angels in heaven have a God.
  b) "" = I have something to drink at home.

5) Locative sentence – This type of sentence tells the location of a thing.
   
  a) ""                       = Here is the money.
  b) ""                     = He/she is on the mountain.

6) Meteorologic sentence – This type of sentence tells about weather condition, noise level, etc., of a place. 
   
  a) ""                 = It is cold here in Baguio.
  b) ""     = The weather is very hot here in Cebu.

7) Exclamatory remark – Praises and unexpected discoveries belong here.

  a) ""             = You have plenty of cars!
  b) ""                        = You are pretty!
  c) ""                     = You are so noisy!

8) Imperatives – Commands and requests.
   
  a) ""                  = Grill that fish.
  b) ""                 = Come here.
  c) ""               = Do not smoke here.

9) Interrogatives – Questions that are not answerable by yes or no.
   
  a) ""                             = Who are you?
  b) ""                  = What is your name?

10) Confirmation – Questions that are basically answered by yes or no. Constructed like the first six sentence types with the insertion of the particle "ba" as a second term.
   
  a) ""               = Is this the Visayas?
  b) ""                 = Do you know how to swim?
  c) ""         = What language do you speak?
  d) ""                = Shall this fish be grilled?

Footnotes

References

External links
Visayan Academy of Arts and Letters
Academic Papers about Cebuano

Cebuano language
Austronesian grammars